Stanton is an unincorporated community in Chilton County, Alabama, United States.  The community has a post office, with postmasters appointed from 1883 to 2006. A wedge tornado struck here on March 21, 1932 taking seven lives.

Geography

Churches 
There are two churches in Stanton, Ebenezer Baptist Church, established in 1819, and Stanton Bible Methodist Church.

United States Civil War 
The Battle of Ebenezer Church took place near Stanton on April 1, 1865, during Wilson's Raid into Alabama in the final full month of the American Civil War.

References 

Unincorporated communities in Alabama
Unincorporated communities in Chilton County, Alabama